Haimbachia diminutalis is a moth in the family Crambidae. It was described by Hahn William Capps in 1965. It is found in North America, where it has been recorded from Oklahoma and Texas.

The wingspan is about 16 mm. Adults are on wing in May, July and October.

References

Haimbachiini
Moths described in 1965